The National Hockey League (NHL) is a professional ice hockey league composed of 32 teams, founded in 1917. Each team may select a captain, who has the "privilege of discussing with the referee any questions relating to interpretation of rules which may arise during the progress of a game." Each team is also permitted to select alternate captains, who serve when the captain is not on the ice.

Rule 6.2 of the 2008–09 Official NHL Rulebook indicates that "[only] when the captain is not in uniform, the coach shall have the right to designate three alternate captains. This must be done prior to the start of the game." Many NHL teams with a named captain select more than two alternate captains and rotate the "A" among these players throughout the season. 

Goaltenders are not permitted to serve as captains during games. This rule was instituted in 1948 after teams complained that it took Montreal Canadiens goaltender Bill Durnan too long to skate to talk with the officials and back to his crease. Vancouver Canucks goaltender Roberto Luongo served as captain for two seasons (2008–09 and 2009–10), but because of the League's rule, he was not allowed to serve as captain on-ice or wear the "C" on his jersey, though it was incorporated into the artwork on his mask. As a result, the Canucks were allowed to dress three alternate captains in games, as opposed to the League standard of two. Two (of the three) alternate captains handled on-ice duties in Luongo's place. Other than Durnan and Luongo, five other goaltenders have captained their team: John Ross Roach of the Toronto St. Patricks, George Hainsworth of the Montreal Canadiens, Roy Worters of the New York Americans, Alec Connell of the original Ottawa Senators and Charlie Gardiner of the Chicago Black Hawks.

When Connor McDavid was named captain of the Edmonton Oilers, he became the youngest permanent captain in NHL history. Gabriel Landeskog of the Colorado Avalanche and Sidney Crosby of the Pittsburgh Penguins, are the second- and third-youngest players to be named captain in NHL history, respectively. In 1984, Brian Bellows was named interim captain of the Minnesota North Stars when Craig Hartsburg was injured, and is the youngest player to captain a team in NHL history. However, because Bellows served only on an interim basis, McDavid retains the distinction of being the youngest permanent captain in the League's history. Mark Messier is the only player to captain two separate teams to Stanley Cup championships, those being the 1990 Edmonton Oilers and the 1994 New York Rangers. Sidney Crosby also became the youngest captain to win the Stanley Cup with the Pittsburgh Penguins in 2009, when Crosby was just 21 years old. The oldest permanent captain in league history was Zdeno Chara of the Boston Bruins, who turned 43 years old, during his last NHL season (2019–20) with the Bruins. The longest tenure in league history was Steve Yzerman of the Detroit Red Wings, who served as captain of the Red Wings for nineteen seasons, over a span of twenty years.

Key 
 Spent entire NHL career with team

Captains 

Twenty-four of the thirty-two NHL teams currently have a captain. The eight teams without a captain are the Anaheim Ducks, Arizona Coyotes, Calgary Flames, Philadelphia Flyers, Seattle Kraken, St. Louis Blues, Vancouver Canucks and Winnipeg Jets. Of the twenty-four captains, nineteen of them have been with their team for their entire career. The current longest-tenured captain in the league is Sidney Crosby of the Pittsburgh Penguins, who has served in that role since May 31, 2007.

Alternate captains

Thirty of the thirty-two NHL teams have named at least the regulation two alternate captains (the exception being the Columbus Blue Jackets and Detroit Red Wings). Of the eighty-two alternate captains, forty-seven of them have been with their team for their entire NHL career. Teams that have named more than the regulation two alternate captains (or three in the case of teams without a captain) are required to rotate the two (or three) "A"s between those players by methods of their choosing. The current longest-tenured alternate captain in the league is Evgeni Malkin of the Pittsburgh Penguins who has served in that role since 2008.

References
Team rosters

Specific

Lists of National Hockey League players
Captains
National Hockey League players
Ice hockey captains